A Family Affair is a 1984 Hong Kong comedy-drama film directed by and starring Dean Shek, and co-starring Samuel Hui, Jenny Tseng, Olivia Cheng and Melvin Wong.

Plot
Wing-cheung (Samuel Hui) and Nancy (Olivia Cheng) have separated due to personality clashes, leaving their pair of children, Tommy (Siu Ban-ban) and Maisy (Helen Chan), under the care of Nancy's father, Alex (Dean Shek). Not long after, Wing-cheung and Nancy have each met new lovers. Not wanting his grandchildren to fall into the hands of stepparents, Alex devise a plan for Wing-cheung and Nancy to reconcile. However, his plan backfires and Wing-cheung and Nancy eventually file for divorce. Feeling disappointed and upset, Tommy and Maisy run away from home.

Cast
Samuel Hui as Chan Wing-cheung
Olivia Cheng as Nancy
Dean Shek as Alex
Melvin Wong as George Ma
Jenny Tseng as Linda (special appearance)
Siu Ban-ban as Tommy
Helen Chan as Maisy
Yu Mo-lin as Cleaning lady
Yat-poon Chai as Policeman at station

Theme song
Love Is Invincible (無敵是愛)
Composer/Lyricist: Samuel Hui
Singer: Samuel Hui, Jenny Tseng

Reception

Critical
So Good Review gave the film a negative review criticizing the mood of the film as "irritating" and its melodramatic moments as "hysteria".

Box office
The film grossed HK$22,129,187 at the Hong Kong box office during its theatrical run from 15 August to 5 September 1984.

Accolades

References

External links

A Family Affair at Hong Kong Cinemagic

1984 films
1984 comedy-drama films
Hong Kong comedy-drama films
Films directed by Dean Shek
1980s Cantonese-language films
Films about families
Films about divorce
Films set in Hong Kong
Films shot in Hong Kong
1980s Hong Kong films